Un Tributo (a José José) (English A tribute to José José) is a 1998 tribute album to Mexican singer José José.

Paying homage to José José for his influence on Latin pop music, the album was recorded by several popular Latin artists of different musical genres such as Molotov, Cafe Tacuba, Julieta Venegas, Moenia, Beto Cuevas, and Aleks Syntek.

The main hits of the album were: "Lo que no fue, no será" by El Gran Silencio, "Una mañana" by Cafe Tacuba, "Lo pasado, pasado" by Maldita Vecindad, "Gavilán o paloma" by La Lupita and "Volcán" by Moenia (the last two released video clip aired on MTV). Cafe Tacuba performed the song "Una mañana" on their MTV Unplugged in 1995.

The album started a trend of Latin rock bands and hip hop artists recording old songs from music icons such as Juan Gabriel and Sandro de América, as an homage. In 2013, another album was released titled Un Tributo (a José José) 2.

Tracks
"Lo pasado, pasado" — Maldita Vecindad - 3:20
Originally released on Lo Pasado, Pasado.
"El Triste" — Julieta Venegas - 4:18
Originally released on El Triste (album).
"Payaso" — Molotov - 3:49
Originally released on Reflexiones.
"Gavilán o paloma" — La Lupita - 3:55
Originally released on Reencuentro.
"La nave del olvido" — Beto Cuevas - 4:40
Originally released on La Nave del Olvido.
"Me basta" — Poncho Kingz - 4:22
Originally released on Gracias.
"Volcán" — Moenia - 4:41
Originally released on Volcán.
"Amnesia" — Control Machete - 4:56
Originally released on En las Buenas... y en las Malas.
"Preso" — Aleks Syntek - 4:51
Originally released on Gracias.
"Amar y querer" — Azul Violeta - 6:18
Originally released on Reencuentro.
"Una Mañana" — Cafe Tacuba - 3:01
Originally released on Cuidado.
"Si me dejas ahora" — Leonardo de Lozanne - 4:41
Originally released on Si Me Dejas Ahora.
"Lagrimas" — Pastilla - 3:54
Originally released on Secretos.
"Lo dudo" — Jumbo - 5:00
Originally released on Secretos.
"Lo que no fue, no será" — El Gran Silencio - 5:14
Originally released on Lo Pasado, Pasado.

Personnel
Rubén Albarrán - Art Direction, Artwork, Design
Carlos Arredondo - Engineer, Mixing
Armando Ávila - Arranger, Mixing, Recording
Azul Violeta - Co-producer
Jose Barbosa - Engineer, Mixing
Craig Brock - Engineer, Mixing
Michael Brook - Producer
John Caban - Guitar
Café Tacuba - Co-Producer
Arnulfo Canales - Guitar (Acoustic)
Carlos Castro - Bass
Joe Chiccarelli - Mixing
Rodolfo Cruz - Engineer
Beto Cuevas -  Co-Producer
David Dachinger - Keyboards, Mixing, Percussion, Programming, Vocals (Background)
Gerardo Garza - Engineer, Producer, Vocals (Background)
Rogelio Gómez - Engineer
Señor González - Percussion
Didi Gutman - Guitar, Keyboards, Producer, Programming
Ricardo Haas - Engineer, Mixing, Producer
Alvaro Henriquez -  Guitar, Producer
Antonio Hernandez - Engineer, Mixing, Producer
Edgar Hernandez - Engineer
Diego Herrera - Producer
Jorge 'Chiquis' Amaro - Producer
Cachorro López - Producer
Oscar Lopez - Producer
Ernesto F. Martinez - Bass
Román Martínez - Art Direction, Design
Moenia - Synthesizer
Jorge Mondragon - Executive Producer
Carlos Murguía - Piano
Uriel Natenzon - Bass
Poncho Kingz -  Co-Producer
Luis Román - Engineer
Noel Savón - Percussion
Sebastián Schon - Engineer, Guitar, Keyboards, Programming
Aleks Syntek - Co-producer
Rodolfo Vazquez - Engineer
Joe Zook - Mixing

Sequel
After almost fifteen years since its release, in November 2013, a follow-up to "Volcán: Tributo a José José" was released under the title "Un Tributo 2", featuring performers such as Natalia Lafourcade, Moderatto, Los Claxons, Carla Morrison and Panteón Rococó.

References

1998 albums
José José tribute albums
Spanish-language albums